The Sun Fast 40.3 is a French sailboat that was designed by Daniel Andrieu as a cruiser-racer and was first built in 2004.

Production
The design was built by Jeanneau in France, starting in 2004, but it is now out of production.

Design
The Sun Fast 40.3 is a recreational keelboat, built predominantly of fiberglass, with wood trim. It has a fractional sloop rig, a raked stem, a reverse transom with a swimming platform, an internally mounted spade-type rudder controlled by dual wheels and a fixed fin keel with a weighted bulb. It displaces  and carries  of ballast.

The design has sleeping accommodation for four to six people in two and three-cabin interior configurations. The two cabin interior has a double berth in the bow cabin, a "U"-shaped settee and a two straight settees in the main cabin and an aft cabin with a double berth on the starboard side. The three-cabin version splits the aft cabin into two cabins, each with a double berth. The galley is located on the starboard side, just forward of the companionway ladder. The galley is "L"-shaped and is equipped with a two-burner stove, an ice box and a double sink. A navigation station is opposite the galley, on the port side. The design may be fitted with a single head, located aft on the port side. A second head may be fitted in the bow cabin on the starboard side.

For sailing downwind the design may be equipped with a symmetrical spinnaker.

Operational history
The boat was at one time supported by a class club that organized racing events, the Sun Fast Association.

See also
List of sailing boat types

References

External links

Keelboats
2000s sailboat type designs
Sailing yachts
Classes of World Sailing
Sailboat type designs by Daniel Andrieu
Sailboat types built by Jeanneau